The 1930 Sam Houston State Bearkats football team was an American football team that represented Sam Houston State Teachers College (now known as Sam Houston State University) during the 1930 college football season as a member of the Texas Intercollegiate Athletic Association (TIAA). In their 8th year under head coach J. W. Jones, the Bearkats compiled an overall record of 9–1, with a mark of 4–0 in conference play, and finished as TIAA champion.

Schedule

References

Sam Houston State
Sam Houston Bearkats football seasons
Sam Houston State Bearkats football